The Second Cabinet of Kim Kielsen is the incumbent Government of Greenland, in office since 2 February 2016. It is a coalition majority government consisting of Siumut, Demokraatit and Atassut.

List of ministers
The Social Democratic Siumut has 5 ministers including the Prime Minister. The Social liberal Democrats has 2 ministers. The Liberalistic Solidarity has 2 ministers.

|}

Party breakdown 
Party breakdown of cabinet ministers:

See also 
Cabinet of Greenland

References

 

Government of Greenland
Coalition governments
Politics of Greenland
Political organisations based in Greenland
Kielsen, Kim 2
2016 establishments in Greenland
Cabinets established in 2016
2016 in Greenland
Greenland politics-related lists